Sir Harry Simon Samuel  (3 August 1853 – 26 April 1934) was an English Member of Parliament for Limehouse and then Norwood in London. He was an advocate of protection in trade and he campaigned against free trade during his political career.

Biography

Early life
Samuel was born at 40 Gloucester Place near Portman Square in Marylebone, London, the son of Horatio Simon Samuel, a cooper, and Henrietta Montefiore. He was educated at Eastbourne College and then St John's College, Cambridge, where he received a Bachelor of Arts.

Career
He became a partner in the firm of Montefiore & Company.

Politics
Samuel retired from business to enter politics with the Unionist party and, in 1889, he became a prospective candidate in St Pancras East. So as not to split the Conservative vote in 1892 Samuel stood in the 1892 election for the Conservative Party in the Limehouse constituency but the seat was won by the Liberal Party candidate, John Stewart Wallace, with a majority of 270.

In the 1895, he stood again and was elected as Member of Parliament for Limehouse with a majority of 590. During the election campaign he was the subject of Antisemitic comments from his Liberal-Labour opponent William Marcus Thompson. He was re-elected in 1900 with a majority of 538 but lost the seat in 1906 to Liberal William Pearce. In 1903, he had been appointed a Knight Bachelor.

In January 1910, he was elected back to parliament with a 1778 majority in the Norwood constituency, a seat he then held until he retired as an MP at the 1922 election. He was appointed a member of the Privy Council in 1916. He was also a Freeman of the City of London and a member of the Cooper's Company.

Personal life
In 1878, he married Rose Beddington. They had four children: three sons and one daughter. His daughter Nora married Percy de Worms (1873–1941).

He died in 1934 at Villa Alexandra in Monte Carlo aged 80. His memorial service was held at West London Synagogue.

References

1853 births
1934 deaths
People from Marylebone
Alumni of St John's College, Cambridge
People educated at Eastbourne College
Members of the Privy Council of the United Kingdom
Members of the Parliament of the United Kingdom for English constituencies
UK MPs 1895–1900
UK MPs 1900–1906
UK MPs 1910
UK MPs 1910–1918
UK MPs 1918–1922
Knights Bachelor
Jewish British politicians
Conservative Party (UK) MPs for English constituencies
Burials at Golders Green Jewish Cemetery